The Alexander Blewett III School of Law is a law school at the University of Montana in Missoula. It was established in 1911 and remains Montana's only law school. , the school accepted 83 applicants. The school tied for 103rd in the 2023 U.S. News & World Report law school rankings. In 2009, National Jurist magazine ranked the school 6 in best value nationally, with its graduates passing the bar at a rate of 95%. The school has been praised for its innovative integration of theory and practice.

History
The school was established in 1911 as the first law school in Montana. It originally covered three academic years and gave special attention to the practice of court work, procedure, mining, and irrigation law in addition to the practice of law in Montana and the Western states in general. It was admitted to membership in the Association of American Law Schools in 1914 and by the American Bar Association (ABA) in 1923.

Studies
The school offers concentrations in the areas of trial advocacy and dispute resolution, Native American law, and business and tax law. As Montana is home to seven Indian Reservations and to eight state-recognized tribal nations, the school's Native American law courses, Native American law clinic, and Native American Law Student Association provide opportunities for students to learn about and participate in the administration of justice for Native Americans. The school publishes the Montana Law Review.

Many students enroll in the natural resource and environmental law courses where the school offers a certificate program in Environmental and Natural Resource Law, natural resource clinics, and opportunities to participate on the Public Land and Resources Law Review. The law school's Natural Resources & Environmental Law Program (NREP) has been nationally ranked among the top 27 environmental law programs in the country, receiving an “A” grade for the breadth of its environmental training, including its certificate concentration in natural resources and environmental law, its curricular offerings, Public Land & Resources Law Review, national environmental law moot court team, Environmental Law Group, and its law clinic program focusing on natural resources and environmental law issues.

The school offers three joint–degree programs. Students can combine their law degrees with a Master of Science in Environmental Studies, a Master of Business Administration, or a Master of Public Administration. These programs can lead to completion of the joint degree in as little as three years.

Library

New building
In 2008, the school underwent a $14.8 million renovation and addition. The addition includes classrooms with better acoustics, newer technology, audio-visual equipment, disability access, and more small and mid-sized classrooms. 

More space is also provided for the school's clinical program, including its land use, Native American law, criminal defense, and mediation clinics. This space includes client interview rooms, student workrooms, and office space. The renovated building also contains an expanded law library with newer technology to serve the needs students as well as the public.

Employment
According to the school's disclosures as required by the American Bar Association, 67.5% of the class of 2014 obtained full-time, long-term, JD-required employment within nine months of graduation.  Montana's Law School Transparency under-employment score is 22.5%, indicating the percentage of the class of 2014 unemployed, pursuing an additional degree, or working in a non-professional, short-term, or part-time job nine months after graduation.

Cost
The total cost of attendance including the cost of tuition, fees, and living expenses for the 2014–2015 academic year was $26,739.26 for residents and $45,424.46 for nonresidents. The Law School Transparency estimated debt-financed cost of attendance for three years at $91,827 for residents and $161,494 for nonresidents.

Notable alumni
 Forrest H. Anderson (1913–1989), Montana Attorney General, Montana Governor and Montana Supreme Court Justice
 Diane Barz (1943–2014), Montana Supreme Court Justice
 Eldena Bear Don’t Walk, Chief Justice of the Crow Nation
 Gordon Belcourt, former Executive Director of the Montana-Wyoming Tribal Leaders Council
 George Hugo Boldt (1903–1984), United States District Judge, Western District, Washington
 John W. Bonner (1902–1970), Montana Governor
 James R. Browning (1918–2012), Clerk of the United States Supreme Court, Chief Judge United States Court of Appeals for the Ninth Circuit
 Dana L. Christensen, U.S. District Judge, Montana
 Charles E. Erdmann, Montana Supreme Court Justice, Circuit Judge United States Court of Appeals for the Armed Forces
 Tim Fox, Montana Attorney General
 Sam E. Haddon, U.S. District Judge, Montana
 Paul G. Hatfield, U.S. District Judge, Montana, Chief Justice of the Montana Supreme Court, United States Senator
 William James Jameson (1898–1990), U.S. District Judge, Montana
 Howard A. Johnson, Chief  Justice of the Montana Supreme Court
 Denise Juneau, Montana Superintendent of Public Instruction
 Charles C. Lovell, U.S. District Judge, Montana
 Lee Metcalf, Montana Supreme Court Justice, United States Senator
 Donald W. Molloy, U.S. District Judge, Montana
 William Daniel Murray (1908–1994), U.S. District Judge, Montana
 Arnold Olsen (1916–1990), Attorney General, U.S. Representative
 Marc Racicot, Montana Governor, Montana Attorney General
 James A. Rice, Montana Supreme Court Justice
 Jim Shea, Montana Supreme Court Justice
 Russell Evans Smith (1908–1990), U.S. District Judge, Montana
 Jack D. Shanstrom, U.S. District Judge, Montana
 Sidney R. Thomas, Chief United States circuit judge of the United States Court of Appeals for the Ninth Circuit
 John Warner, Montana Supreme Court Justice
 Susan P. Watters, U.S. District Judge, Montana
 Martha Williams, director of the U.S. Fish & Wildlife Service

External links

Schools and colleges of the University of Montana
Educational institutions established in 1911
Law schools in Montana
1911 establishments in Montana